Maryland's Legislative District 28 is one of 47 districts in the state for the Maryland General Assembly. It covers part of Charles County.

Demographic characteristics
As of the 2020 United States census, the district had a population of 147,401, of whom 111,719 (75.8%) were of voting age. The racial makeup of the district was 50,992 (34.6%) White, 73,618 (49.9%) African American, 1,072 (0.7%) Native American, 5,304 (3.6%) Asian, 69 (0.0%) Pacific Islander, 4,522 (3.1%) from some other race, and 11,747 (8.0%) from two or more races. Hispanic or Latino of any race were 10,006 (6.8%) of the population.

The district had 104,490 registered voters as of October 17, 2020, of whom 17,433 (16.7%) were registered as unaffiliated, 21,446 (20.5%) were registered as Republicans, 64,477 (61.7%) were registered as Democrats, and 644 (0.6%) were registered to other parties.

Political representation
The district is represented for the 2023–2027 legislative term in the State Senate by Arthur Ellis (D) and in the House of Delegates by Debra Davis (D), Edith J. Patterson (D) and C. T. Wilson (D).

History
Between 1983 and 1990, District 28 was divided into two subdistricts, 28A and 28B.

References

Charles County, Maryland
28
28